The  Miss Idaho USA  pageant is a competition that selects the representative for the state of Idaho in the Miss USA pageant and the name of the title held by that winner. It is currently produced by Pageants NW Productions based in Puyallup, Washington.

Idaho's first placement at Miss USA came in 1964 with Dorothy Johnson, the first African-American semi-finalist.  Their second placement came in 1997 when former Miss Idaho Teen USA and Miss Teen USA 1989 Brandi Sherwood placed first runner-up.  She later became the first woman to be crowned both Miss USA and Miss Teen USA when she succeeded winner Brook Lee who became Miss Universe.  Sherwood has since pursued a career as an actress, and is a rotating model on The Price Is Right. The third came in 2004 when former Miss Idaho Teen USA 1999 Kimberly Glyn Weible made the top 10.  Their fourth was in 2009, when Melissa Weber placed in the top 15.

Idaho is currently third tied with North Carolina in number of former teens have competed in this pageant: nine, including Sherwood, and they are all from the same state. It is the largest former Teens competed in this pageant from the same state without being won the Teen title previously from other states. In addition, three have also competed at Miss America.

Hannah Menzner of Boise was crowned Miss Idaho USA 2023 on September 11, 2022, at Red Lion Hotel Templin's on the River in Post Falls, Idaho and will represent Idaho for the title of Miss USA 2023.

Results summary

Placements
1st Runner-Up: Brandi Sherwood (1997), Kim Layne (2020)
Top 10: Kimberly Weible (2004)
Top 15: Dorothy Johnson (1964), Melissa Weber (2009)

Idaho holds a record of 5 placements at Miss USA.

Awards
Miss Congeniality: Sandra Baldwin (1967)

Titleholders

Color key

Notes

References

External links
Official website

Idaho
Idaho culture
Women in Idaho
Recurring events established in 1952
Annual events in Idaho
1952 establishments in Idaho